Hood: Outlaws & Legends is an action video game developed by Sumo Newcastle and published by Focus Home Interactive. The game was released for Microsoft Windows, PlayStation 4, PlayStation 5, Xbox One and Xbox Series X and Series S on May 10, 2021.

Gameplay
Hood: Outlaws & Legends is a multiplayer action video game played from a third-person perspective. The player assumes control of an outlaw who must infiltrate a keep of an authoritarian power named the State, and compete against a rival team to steal the treasure hidden in the keep's vault. The player can form a group of four in order to pull off the heist, which has three phases. The first phase requires the player to steal the key from the Sheriff of Nottingham, a boss character in the game. Once the player acquires the key, they are given clues regarding the location of the vault, though the opponent team would also be notified. Stealth is essential, as guards may call for reinforcements and close off certain areas, blocking access to the vault. The opponent team can also observe the behaviors of the AI and pinpoint the location of the opposite team.

Different characters in the game have different weapons and abilities. For instance, Maid Marion is equipped with a crossbow and smoke grenades, while Tooke is equipped with a flail. Players must coordinate with each other in order to succeed. For instance, only Little John has the ability to open locked gates. If the team does not have a tank character, they may need to find other ways to progress. Once a team acquires a treasure, they must locate an extraction point, though it would be heavily guarded by knights and the Sheriff. The location of a vault in a map is randomly decided, and the AI will exhibit different patrol pattern in each playthrough. After each match, the player can access the Scales of Justice, where they will decide the amount of gold they will keep and the amount they will give back to the people. Being generous unlocks more perks and skills, but they needs to be purchased through gold owned by the player.

Development
CCP Newcastle, the developer of Eve Valkyrie, was acquired by Sumo Digital from CCP Games in January 2018 and renamed to Sumo Newcastle. The project was originally an unrealised pitch by Sumo Sheffield. It was initially envisioned as a cooperative game featuring a "dark version of Robin Hood", though it was redesigned as a player-versus-player-versus environment (PvPvE) project due to the team's expertise in competitive multiplayer games. The team was in particular inspired by Hunt: Showdown (2019) by Crytek. The Sheriff was inspired by Tyrant from the Resident Evil games.

Robin of Locksley, and Robin the Earl of Huntingdon, two competing legends, laid the foundation for the game's premise. The team avoided naming the characters in the game as Robin Hood because "[the mystery of] who was behind the hood was far more interesting than defining [it]". The lore for the game's characters, maps and collectables was written by Steven A. McKay, author of the Forest Lord historical fiction series which is based on the Robin Hood legend. The studio deliberately avoided naming any location or set the game in a known period so that the gameplay team will have less restrictions and more creative freedom. The locations in the game were inspired by real world castles such as Dover, Lindisfarne and Bamburgh, though the team also drew inspirations from locations from Game of Thrones, such as Iron Islands and Dragonstone. The buildings and structures in the game were also inspired by Brutalist architecture, which helped reflect the authoritarian and oppressive nature of the State.

Publisher Focus Home Interactive announced the game in May 2020. The game was released on May 10, 2021 for Windows, PlayStation 4, PlayStation 5, Xbox One and Xbox Series X and Series S.

Reception

The game received "mixed or average reviews" according to review aggregator Metacritic upon release.

References

External links
 

2021 video games
Action video games
Cooperative video games
Focus Entertainment games
Multiplayer online games
PlayStation 4 games
PlayStation 5 games
Robin Hood video games
Stealth video games
Sumo Digital games
Unreal Engine games
Video games developed in the United Kingdom
Video games set in the United Kingdom
Windows games
Xbox One games
Xbox Series X and Series S games